Price Creek is a stream in the U.S. state of Ohio.

Price Creek was named for Henry Price, a pioneer who settled there.

See also
List of rivers of Ohio

References

Rivers of Darke County, Ohio
Rivers of Preble County, Ohio
Rivers of Ohio